The 2021 Tenerife Challenger was a professional tennis tournament played on hard courts. It was the first edition of the tournament which was part of the 2021 ATP Challenger Tour. It took place in Tenerife, Spain between 1 and 7 November 2021.

Singles main-draw entrants

Seeds

 1 Rankings are as of 25 October 2021.

Other entrants
The following players received wildcards into the singles main draw:
  Feliciano López
  Daniel Rincón
  Fernando Verdasco

The following player received entry into the singles main draw using a protected ranking:
  Joris De Loore

The following players received entry from the qualifying draw:
  Yan Bondarevskiy
  David Ionel
  Vladyslav Orlov
  Alexander Shevchenko

The following player received entry as a lucky loser:
  Filip Jianu

Champions

Singles

 Tallon Griekspoor def.  Feliciano López 6–4, 6–4.

Doubles

  Nuno Borges /  Francisco Cabral def.  Jeevan Nedunchezhiyan /  Purav Raja 6–3, 6–4.

References

2021 ATP Challenger Tour
2021 in Spanish tennis
November 2021 sports events in Spain
2021